Fabre is a French surname and a given name.

Fabre may also refer to:

Musée Fabre, a museum in the French city of Montpellier 
Pierre Fabre Group, a pharmaceutical and cosmetics company
Fabre (Montreal Metro), a stop on the Montreal Metro
Fabre (electoral district), a Quebec provincial riding
Saint-Édouard-de-Fabre, Quebec, usually shortened to Fabre